The year 1819 in architecture involved some significant architectural events and new buildings.

Events
 Construction of Karlsborg Fortress in Sweden begins.
 Construction of Mikhailovsky Palace in Saint Petersburg begins.
 Sculptural work begins at the Schauspielhaus in Berlin (the modern-day Konzerthaus Berlin), designed by Karl Friedrich Schinkel.

Buildings and structures

Buildings completed
 Casa de la Guerra, Santa Barbara, USA
 Cathedral Church of St. Paul, Boston, USA, designed by Alexander Parris and Solomon Willard
 Greek-Catholic Church in Giurtelecu Şimleului, Romania (demolished in 1973)
 The Plymouth Athenaeum, England, designed by John Foulston (destroyed in 1941)
 New Théâtre de l'Odéon in Paris, designed by Pierre Thomas Baraguay (opened in September)
 Vartiovuori Observatory, Turku, Finland

Awards
 Grand Prix de Rome, architecture: Félix-Emmanuel Callet and Jean-Baptiste Lesueur.

Births
 January 20 – Edward Milner, English landscape architect (died 1884)
 February 8 – John Ruskin, English polymath and critic (died 1900)
 May 15 – Alphonse Balat, Belgian architect (died 1895)

 May 20 – Sir Horace Jones, Architect and Surveyor to the City of London (died 1887)
 Approximate date – Francis Fowler, English architect (died 1893)

Deaths
 January 22 – Gian Antonio Selva, Italian neoclassical architect (born 1751)
 March 13 – Charles Wyatt, English politician and architect (born 1758)
 August 1 – Pierre-Adrien Pâris, French architect, painter and designer (born 1745)

References

Architecture
Years in architecture
19th-century architecture